The Sălard is a small river in the Gurghiu Mountains, Mureș County, northern Romania. It is a left tributary of the river Mureș. It flows through the municipality Lunca Bradului, and joins the Mureș in the village Sălard. It is fed by several smaller streams, including the Pârâul Rece and Jirca.

References

Rivers of Romania
Rivers of Mureș County